Chawk Mosque may refer to:

 Chawk Mosque, a mosque in Dhaka, Bangladesh
 Chawk Masjid, a mosque in Murshidabad, India